The City of a Thousand Delights (German: Die Stadt der tausend Freuden) is a 1927 German silent film directed by Carmine Gallone and starring Paul Richter, Adele Sandrock and Langhorn Burton. It is based on the 1907 novel The City of Pleasure by the British writer Arnold Bennett.

The film's sets were designed by the art directors Otto Erdmann and Hans Sohnle.

Cast
Paul Richter as Jack Ilam  
Adele Sandrock as Seine Mutter 
Langhorn Burton as Carlos Carpentaria  
Claire Rommer as Juliette, their sister  
Renée Héribel as Pauline, Jack Ilam's cousin  
Frances Cuyler as Rosie, Jack Ilam's cousin 
Gaston Modot as Jetsam

References

External links

Films of the Weimar Republic
German silent feature films
Films directed by Carmine Gallone
Films based on works by Arnold Bennett
Films based on British novels
Films set in amusement parks
German black-and-white films